Martin O'Neill (born 17 June 1975) is a Scottish former professional footballer, who played for Clyde, Kilmarnock, Stranraer, Clydebank, Stirling Albion, East Fife and Dumbarton  in the Scottish Football League.

He played for the Scotland U21 team at the Toulon Tournament in 1997. The team were beaten by Brazil in the semi-finals.

O'Neill later returned to Clyde in a non-playing capacity, working in a marketing role in May 2007.

References

External links

1975 births
Living people
Footballers from Glasgow
Scottish footballers
Association football defenders
Clyde F.C. players
Kilmarnock F.C. players
Stranraer F.C. players
Clydebank F.C. (1965) players
Stirling Albion F.C. players
East Fife F.C. players
Dumbarton F.C. players
Auchinleck Talbot F.C. players
Scottish Football League players
Scotland under-21 international footballers
Clyde F.C. non-playing staff